Night of the Hell Hamsters is a 2006 comedy horror short film in which demonic possessed hamsters terrorize a young babysitter and her boyfriend.

Plot
Karl pays his girlfriend Julie a surprise visit while she is babysitting her neighbour's children.  He brings with him a Ouija board that Julie has been asking to play with.  However, unhappy about messing around with the occult, Karl has deliberately left the board at home. Determined to have her way, Julie fashions a makeshift Ouija board out of an innocent child's alphabet toy, and, when Karl is bitten by one of the hamsters, she uses a drop of his blood to consecrate it. The couple then attempt to summon up a spirit, unaware that they have come up with the name of a demon, which arrives in a bolt of lightning, electrocuting the family hamsters and then possessing their dead bodies, turning them into demonic possessed zombie hamsters
.

Cast
  Stephanie Ratcliff as Julie
 Paul O'Neill as Karl
 Director Paul Campion and producer Elisabeth Pinto play two of the Giant Zombie Rabbits in the intro sequence.

Awards
2007 Best Horror Film, Vine Short Film Festival, USA.
2007 Best Director, A Night of Horror Short Film Festival, Australia.
2007 Audience Favourite, Zompire: The Undead Film Festival, USA.
2007 Audience Favourite, Big Mountain Short Film Festival, New Zealand.
2007 Best Cinematography, Tabloid Witch Awards, USA.
2007 Honorable Mention, Tabloid Witch Awards, USA.

Nominations
2007 Best Short Film, Terror Film Festival, USA.
2007 Best Editing, Terror Film Festival, USA.
2007 Best Music Score, Terror Film Festival, USA.
2007 Best Special Effects, Terror Film Festival, USA.

External links
 

2006 films
New Zealand independent films
British supernatural horror films
2006 comedy horror films
2000s monster movies
British comedy horror films
British independent films
New Zealand short films
British monster movies
2006 independent films
New Zealand comedy horror films
2000s English-language films
2000s British films